Lamar DeShawn Gordon (born January 7, 1980) is a former American football running back. He played college football at North Dakota State University. He attended Cudahy High School in Cudahy, Wisconsin.  He was a high school teammate of John Navarre, former Michigan quarterback.

Professional career

St. Louis Rams
Gordon was drafted by the Rams on the third round of the 2002 NFL Draft. During his two season in St. Louis, Gordon rushed for 526 yards and two touchdowns while serving as the backup for 2011 Pro Football Hall of Fame inductee Marshall Faulk.  Gordon also made 38 catches, including two receiving touchdowns during his rookie season in 2002.

Miami Dolphins
In 2004 Gordon was traded to the Miami Dolphins for a third round pick in the 2005 NFL Draft. In what would be his only season as a Dolphin, Gordon appeared in three games, rushing for 64 yards on 35 carries. He also caught 13 passes for a total of 74 yards. His season was cut short due to a dislocated shoulder.

Philadelphia Eagles
Gordon spent the 2005 season as a member of the Philadelphia Eagles where he served as the backup running back to Brian Westbrook.  He appeared in 14 of the team's 16 games.  Gordon carried the ball 54 times for the Eagles in 2005, gaining 154 yards and rushing for one touchdown. He also made eleven catches for a total of 79 yards.

Detroit Lions
Gordon appeared in one game during the 2006 season with the Detroit Lions. He carried the ball one time, gaining 2 yards.

References

1980 births
Living people
Players of American football from Milwaukee
American football running backs
North Dakota State Bison football players
St. Louis Rams players
Miami Dolphins players
Philadelphia Eagles players
Detroit Lions players